Florian Lukas (16 March 1973) is a German actor.

Filmography

External links

 
 

German male television actors
Male actors from Berlin
1973 births
Living people
German male film actors
20th-century German male actors
21st-century German male actors